Eydoche is a commune in the Isère department in southeastern France. It lies about 45 minutes from Grenoble on the former Route de Lyon, between Champier and Longchenal.

Population

Economy
Eydoche is a farming community, mostly dairy cattle, wheat and corn, with pastoral views. There used to be a fabric mill where very intricate jacquard fabrics were made. Many of the factory's retirees still live in the village. There is a former stone grinding mill owned by the Jullien family, where members of the family still live. Both the fabric and grinding mills were originally powered by water wheels fed from a "ruisseau" or stream.

In recent years a woodworking factory has been established. There is also a trucking company.

Sights
There is the village "place" with the ancient church facing the "Monument des Morts" - with the names of soldiers lost during World War I and World War II. Many of the residents of Eydoche were active in the Resistance during World War II.

The walled cemetery is a short walk from the church.

See also
Communes of the Isère department

References

Communes of Isère
Isère communes articles needing translation from French Wikipedia